Trapania reticulata is a species of sea slug, a dorid nudibranch, a marine gastropod mollusc in the family Goniodorididae.

Distribution
This species was described from the Great Barrier Reef. It has also been reported from the Andaman Sea and Milne Bay, Papua New Guinea which suggests a wide distribution in the central Indo-Pacific region. It has also been photographed in Bali, Indonesia.

Description
This goniodorid nudibranch is translucent yellow with a reticulate pattern of brown pigment on the body, rhinophores, gills, oral tentacles and lateral papillae. The lateral papillae and the rhinophore clubs are unusually large in this species.

Ecology
Trapania reticulata feeds on Entoprocta which often grow on sponges and other living substrata.

References

Goniodorididae
Gastropods described in 1987